The 2019 East Hampshire District Council election took place on 2 May 2019 to elect members of the East Hampshire District Council in England. It was held on the same day as other local elections. New ward boundaries were used, with some new wards created, with others having their boundaries amended. Wards with the same name but amended boundaries are noted. The number of councillors was reduced from 44 to 43.

The election saw the Conservatives lose 10 seats, with the Liberal Democrats (previously the only other party to hold seats in the council), Labour, and Independents gaining seats. The Liberal Democrats, forming the largest opposition, with seven seats in total, an increase of five, with four seats in Alton, two in Whitehill, and one in Murray. Labour won a further two seats, and two seats returned independent councillors.

Summary

Election result

|-

Results by Ward

Alton Amery

Alton Ashdell

Alton Eastbrooke

Alton Holybourne

Alton Westbrooke

Alton Whitedown

Alton Wooteys

Bentworth & Froyle

Binsted, Bentley & Selborne

Bramshott & Liphook

Buriton & East Meon

Clanfield

Four Marks & Medstead

Froxfield, Sheet & Steep

Grayshott

Headley

Horndean Catherington

Horndean Downs

Horndean Kings & Blendworth

Horndean Murray

Lindford

Liss

Petersfield Bell Hill

Petersfield Causeway

Petersfield Heath

Petersfield St Peter's

Ropley, Hawkley & Hangers

Rowlands Castle

Whitehill Chase

Whitehill Hogmoor & Greatham

Whitehill Pinewood

2019-2023 by-elections

Bramshott & Liphook

Grayshott

Horndean Downs

References

Notes

2019 English local elections
May 2019 events in the United Kingdom
2019
2010s in Hampshire